Olmos is a populated centre in the Canelones Department of southern Uruguay.

Geography

Location

Population
In 2011 Olmos had a population of 662.
 
Source: Instituto Nacional de Estadística de Uruguay

References

External links
INE map of Empalme Olmos, Olmos, La Montañesa and Piedra del Toro

Populated places in the Canelones Department